Lee Oi Hin (born 16 July 1999) is a former Hong Kong professional footballer who played as a midfielder.

References

External links

HKFA

1999 births
Living people
Hong Kong footballers
Association football midfielders
Yuen Long FC players
TSW Pegasus FC players
Hong Kong Rangers FC players
HK U23 Football Team players
Hong Kong Premier League players
Hong Kong First Division League players